The Gallant King is a 1920 German silent historical drama film directed by Alfred Halm. It is based on the life of the eighteenth century monarch Augustus the Strong. His story was later made into a 1936 sound film Augustus the Strong.

Cast
In alphabetical order

References

External links

German historical films
1920s historical films
Films of the Weimar Republic
Films directed by Alfred Halm
German silent feature films
UFA GmbH films
Films set in the 1690s
Films set in the 18th century
German black-and-white films
1920s German films